is a passenger railway station located in the city of Takamatsu, Kagawa Prefecture, Japan. It is operated by JR Shikoku and has the station number "T27".

Lines
The station is served by the JR Shikoku Kōtoku Line and is located 1.5 km from the beginning of the line at Takamatsu. Only local services stop at the station.

Layout
Shōwachō Station consists of a side platform serving a single track. There is no station building and the station is unstaffed but a shelter is provided on the platform and a "Tickets Corner" (a small shelter housing an automatic ticket vending machine) is installed. A ramp leads up to the platform from the access road.

History
Japanese National Railways (JNR) opened Shōwachō Station on 23 March 1987 as an additional stop on the existing Kōtoku Line. Just a few days later, on 1 April 1987, JNR was privatized and control of the station passed to JR Shikoku.

Surrounding area
 TKagawa University Saiwaimachi Campus (Headquarters/Faculty of Education/Faculty of Economics/Faculty of Law)
Takamatsu City Historical Museum
Kan Kikuchi Memorial Museum

See also
List of railway stations in Japan

References

External links

Station timetable

Railway stations in Kagawa Prefecture
Railway stations in Japan opened in 1987
Railway stations in Takamatsu